The 1997 North Carolina Tar Heels football team represented the University of North Carolina at Chapel Hill during the 1997 NCAA Division I-A football season. The Tar Heels  played their home games at Kenan Memorial Stadium in Chapel Hill, North Carolina and competed in the Atlantic Coast Conference. The team was coached by Mack Brown finished the season 11–1 overall, 7–1 in the conference.

At the end of the season, Brown left for the University of Texas at Austin and  did not coach in the Gator Bowl victory over Virginia Tech. Carl Torbush, who was the defensive coordinator during the regular season, became the head coach when Brown left. North Carolina credits the regular season to Brown and the Gator Bowl victory to Torbush.

Schedule

Roster

Rankings

Game summaries

vs. Virginia Tech (Gator Bowl)

Players in the 1998 NFL Draft

References

North Carolina
North Carolina Tar Heels football seasons
Gator Bowl champion seasons
North Carolina Tar Heels football